The 2011 COSAFA U-20 Cup (or 2011 Metropolitan COSAFA Under-20 Youth Championships for sponsorship reasons) is the 20th edition of the football tournament that involves the youth teams from Southern Africa. Botswana will host the competition for the second consecutive time.

Group stage

Group A

Group B

Group C

Group D

Knock-out stage

Semi-finals

Third-place playoff

Final

External links
Official website

References

U-20
2011
2011 in Botswana sport